Vasili Strokau (born 9 October 1995 in Minsk) is a Belarusian cyclist, who currently rides for UCI Continental team .

Major results

2013
 7th Overall La Coupe du Président de la Ville de Grudziądz
1st Stage 3
2015
 7th Memoriał Henryka Łasaka
2016
 6th Grand Prix of ISD
 9th Horizon Park Classic
2017
 1st Stage 5 Tour de l'Avenir
 9th Overall Dookoła Mazowsza
2018
 1st Stage 3 Five Rings of Moscow
2019
 1st Stage 2 Tour of Xingtai
2022
 10th Grand Prix Alanya

References

External links

1995 births
Living people
Belarusian male cyclists